The Eastern Zone was one of the three regional zones of the 1987 Davis Cup.

13 teams entered the Eastern Zone in total, with the winner promoted to the following year's World Group. South Korea defeated Japan in the final and qualified for the 1987 World Group.

Participating nations

Draw

First round

Chinese Taipei vs. Singapore

Bangladesh vs. Pakistan

Sri Lanka vs. Philippines

China vs. Indonesia

Hong Kong vs. Malaysia

Quarterfinals

Chinese Taipei vs. New Zealand

Thailand vs. Pakistan

China vs. Philippines

Japan vs. Hong Kong

Semifinals

Thailand vs. New Zealand

China vs. Japan

Final

China vs. New Zealand

References

External links
Davis Cup official website

Davis Cup Asia/Oceania Zone
Eastern Zone